Richard Dorian Goodman (April 19, 1934 – November 6, 1989), known as Dickie Goodman, was an American music and record producer born in Brooklyn, New York. He is best known for inventing and using the technique of the "break-in", an early precursor to sampling, that used brief clips of popular records and songs to "answer" comedic questions posed by voice actors on his novelty records. He also wrote and produced some original material, most often heard on the B-sides of his break-in records. He died from suicide by gunshot on December 6, 1989.

Career
In June 1956, Goodman created his first record, "The Flying Saucer Parts 1 & II", which he co-wrote with his partner Bill Buchanan, and which was a four-minute rewrite of Orson Welles' War of the Worlds radio show. This recording was the subject of a copyright infringement case against Goodman. The court eventually ruled his sampled mix was considered a parody and thus an entirely new work. The song "The Flying Saucer" was officially released under the artist name "Buchanan and Goodman" and was Goodman's highest-charting single on Billboard, peaking at No. 3. Buchanan and Goodman followed up with five other records: "Buchanan and Goodman on Trial" (#80 in 1956), "Banana Boat Story" (in which the duo used a single song, the Tarriers' "Banana Boat Song", as a break-in spoof of broadcast commercials), "Flying Saucer the 2nd" (#18 in 1957), "The Creature (From a Science Fiction Movie)" (by Buchanan and Ancell) (#85 in 1957), and "Santa and the Satellite (Parts I & II)" (#32 in 1957). Both Buchanan and Goodman attempted to continue with the break-in approach after their breakup, but only Goodman had sustained success. Buchanan's later collaboration with Brill Building legend Howard Greenfield was not as successful.

There were some lawsuits filed against Buchanan and Goodman for the use of unlicensed materials. the couple had operated their business from a telephone booth at a pharmacy. While the couple got richer, the courts, however, ate up the profits (Source: Dick Clark's: 25 years of Rock and Roll. 1981)

With Mickey Shorr in 1959, Goodman recorded two singles under the name 'Spencer and Spencer', both of which relied much less on sampling and more on sketch comedy. "Russian Bandstand" was a re-imagining of the then-popular TV series American Bandstand set in a totalitarian Soviet Union. "Stagger Lawrence" imposed Lloyd Price's recording of "Stagger Lee" onto a spoof of The Lawrence Welk Show, borrowing heavily from an earlier Welk parody done by Stan Freberg. Neither recording with Shorr would be as popular as the recordings Goodman made with Buchanan.

Starting in 1961, Goodman released his pieces as a solo artist. He scored three Billboard Hot 100 hits based on the hit TV series The Untouchables: "The Touchables" (#60), "The Touchables in Brooklyn" (#42), and "Santa and the Touchables" (#99).

In 1962, Goodman spoofed Ben Casey with "Ben Crazy" (#44). In 1966, his spoof of Batman resulted in "Batman & His Grandmother" (#70).

In 1964, Goodman decided to try something different: rather than his usual "break-in" records, he recorded an entire album of parodies called My Son the Joke. The title was a take-off of the then-highly popular Allan Sherman records; unlike Sherman, Goodman's material was much more risque (such as "Harry's Jockstrap", featuring his wife Susan, to the tune of "Frère Jacques") and failed to chart.

During the late 1960s, Goodman recorded a mostly musical album featuring his wife, aptly entitled Dickie Goodman and His Wife Susan. Mr. Goodman sang one track on the record ("Never Play Poker with a Man Named Doc (or Eat at a Place Called Mom's)", paraphrasing Nelson Algren's novel A Walk on the Wild Side), and produced two break-in style pieces, with Susan singing the rest of the songs.

In 1969, Goodman parodied the political unrest on college campuses with "On Campus" (#45) and the first moon landing with "Luna Trip" (#95). Vik Venus' Goodman-like "Moonflight" reached an even higher No. 38 on 9 August 1969, one week after "On Campus" peaked. Goodman's records also inspired KQV morning disc jockey Bob DeCarlo to cut his own sample-spliced top 10 hit "Convention '72" as by the Delegates. Goodman himself spoofed political issues such as the Watergate scandal with "Watergrate" (#42 in 1973), the 1973 energy crisis with "Energy Crisis '74" (#33 in 1974), and Richard Nixon with "Mr. President" (#73 in 1974). Goodman failed to chart with a different version of "Mr. President" in 1981 after Ronald Reagan became president.

In addition to work under his own name, Goodman also produced for other acts. John & Ernest's "Superfly Meets Shaft" (#31 in 1973), while oriented more toward a black audience, retained Goodman's "break-in" format. An unusual act Goodman produced was the Glass Bottle; Goodman created the band primarily as an advertising ploy to promote actual glass bottles, which were going out of fashion due to soda companies beginning to use plastic bottles. The Glass Bottle recorded two singles. Both were straight pop songs. "I Ain't Got Time Anymore" hit No. 36 in 1971. Also, in 1974, Goodman anonymously released Screwy T.V., an album of risque parodies of then-popular TV series. This album was even less popular than My Son the Joke, as many record shops kept it "under the counter", due to its cover featuring two nude models (reportedly Susan and Dickie Goodman themselves) seen from the rear.

In 1975, Goodman parodied the film Jaws with "Mr. Jaws" (#4 in 1975), becoming Goodman's biggest-selling record by achieving R.I.A.A. gold disc status in September 1975. The record shot to No. 1 on 11 October 1975 on Chicago's WLS, who played a customized version featuring "This is Dickie Goodman at WLS ..." at the beginning.

Goodman's final chart record was "Kong" (#48 in 1977), spoofing the 1976 King Kong film remake, followed by others that failed to chart. Altogether, Goodman charted seventeen hits, with five of them reaching the top 40. Goodman produced several other break-in records which garnered airplay and charted only in regional areas, usually Los Angeles and New York City, but in a few other areas as well.

Luniverse, Goodman's record label, also featured works by other artists, including the Del-Vikings.

Goodman's break-in records were themselves spoofed by Albert Brooks in a comedy bit called "Party from Outer Space".

Death
Goodman died in North Carolina from a self-inflicted gunshot wound. He is survived by his two sons, Jon and Jed, and his daughter Janie. In 2000, Jon released The King of Novelty, a biography of Dickie's life and work, along with autobiographical material. The book, which also contains the most comprehensive chronology of Dickie Goodman's records, including CD re-releases, is still available and in print.

Discography

As Buchanan and Goodman

As Spencer and Spencer

Solo

I Really Wanted to Be a "Singar" / Young and Foolish — Rori 714 — 1964; written and produced by Buchanan & Goodman
The Ride of Paul Revere — 1960?
Paul Revere / Oh Susanna Rock — Strand 25002 — 1960 version, Goodman recording under the name Val E. Forge
Space Ship / We Belong Together — Novel N-200 — 1960; Goodman sang on this record
The Touchables (#60) / Martian Melody — Mark-X 8009 — 2/26/61
The Touchables in Brooklyn (#42) / Mystery — Mark-X 8010 — 4/30/61
Horror Movies / Whoa Mule — Rori 601 — 1961
Berlin Top Ten (#116) / Little Tiger — Rori 602—10/23/61
Santa & the Touchables (#99) / North Pole Rock — Rori 701 — 12/31/61
Ben Crazy (#44) / Flip Side — JMD RX-001 / Diamond D-119 — 7/62
Senate Hearing (#116) / Lock Up – 20th Century Records 443 — 11/2/63
Paul Revere — Rori 712 — 1964
My Son the Joke – Comet CLP-69 — 1964; risque nightclub music LP
My Baby Loves Monster Movies / Theme from a Whodunit – DCP International 1111 — 10/3/64
Presidential Interview (Flying Saucer '64) / Paul Revere — Audio Spectrum 75 — 10/1964
The Invasion/What a Lovely Party (8/11/1964)
Frankenstein Meets the Beatles / Dracula Drag – DCP International 1126 — 12/12/64
Schmonanza / Backwards Theme — M.D. 101 — 3/1/65
James Bomb / Seventh Theme — Twirl 2015 — 1965
Never Play Poker with a Man Named Doc or Eat at a Place Called Mom's – 1966; sung by Goodman; produced by Goodman and/or Buchanan
Batman & His Grandmother (#70) / Suspense – Red Bird 10-058 — 5/28/66
Congressional Medal of Honor (sung by Susan Smith Goodman) – 1968
The Space Girl / Very Interesting – Roulette R-7020 — 9/68
Washington Uptight / The Cat — Oron 101 — late 1968
The Modify / Live a Little – Capitol 2407 — 4/17/69; Goodman wrote, produced, and sang
On Campus (#45) / Mombo Suzie—Cotique 158 — 6/28/69
Luna Trip (#95) / My Victrola—Cotique 173 — 9/6/69
Things — 1971
Speaking of Ecology / Dayton's Theme — Ramgo 501 / Scepter 12339 — 7/71
Watergrate (#42) / Friends — Rainy Wednesday 202—6/16/73
Purple People Eater (#119) / Ruthie's Theme — Rainy Wednesday 204 — 9/15/73
The Constitution / The End — Rainy Wednesday 205 — late 1973
Energy Crisis '74 (#33) / The Mistake — Rainy Wednesday 206 — 2/74
Screwy T.V. – (Label unknown) – 1974; Goodman's impersonations of popular TV shows
Mr. President (#73) / Popularity — Rainy Wednesday 207 — 6/15/74
Gerry Ford (A Special Report) / Robert — Rainy Wednesday 208 — late 1974
Inflation in the Nation / Jon & Jed's Theme — Rainy Wednesday 209 — 1975
Mr. Jaws (#4) / Irv's Theme — Cash 451 — 9/6/75
Kong (#48) / Ed's Tune — Shock 6 – 2/5/77
Just Released — Tsuaris — 1977
Star Warts / The Boys' Tune — Janus 271 — summer 1977
Mrs. Jaws / Chomp Chomp — Shark 1001 — summer 1978
Super, Superman / Chomp Chomp — Shark 1002 — early 1979
Energy Crisis '79 / Pain — Hot Line 1017 — summer 1979
Election '80 – Prelude — fall 1980
Mr. President / Dancin' U.S.A. – Wacko 1001 — spring 1981
The Monster Album – studio unknown – 1980s
Super-Duper Man / Robert's Tune — Wacko 1002 — summer 1981
America '81 (Short Version) / (Long Version) – Wacko 1381 — 1981
Hey, E.T. / Get a Job — Extran 601/Montage P-B-1220 — fall 1982
Hey Dickie! – no label — 1982
Attack of the Z-Monster / Mystery — Z-100 — summer 1983
Radio Russia / Washington Inside-Out – Rhino RNOR 019 — 11/83
The Return of the Jedi Returns (Star Wars IV) – Rhino RNLP 811 — 11/83
Election '84 / Herb's Theme — Shell 711—1984
Safe Sex Report / Safety First — Goodname 100 — late 1987 / early 1988 (Goodman's final recording)

Produced by Goodman

Please Won't You Call Me / Why Should We Break Up — Herald 477 — 1956; produced by Goodman
Forever Young / Come On Baby—Eldorado 504–1956; A-side written by Goodman; both sides produced by him and his partner, Bill Buchanan
Invisible Thing / Some Other Fellow—Luniverse 109 — 1958; written and produced by Goodman
Class Room / Fake Out—ABC-Paramount 45-9963 — 11/2/58; A-side was written and produced by Goodman
John Fitzgerald Kennedy: The Presidential Years, 1960 – 1963 — 20th Century TFM 3127 — 12/61 – 1/64 (Goodman was president at 20th Century Records at the time and released this album immediately after Kennedy's death.)
Sarah Jane / St. Marks & Third (sung by Susan Smith Goodman) – Bang 569 — 7/7/69
The Saxophone Circus! – Avco Embassy AVE 33002 — 1969; produced by Goodman
Coffee, Tea or Cuba / Ode to a Hijacker — Slew 451 — 1971; produced and written by Goodman
The Glass Bottle – Avco Embassy AVE-33012 — 1970; produced by Ramal and Goodman
The Glass Bottle – I Ain't Got Time Anymore (#36) / Things – Avco AVE-4575 — 7/7/71
Because She's Mine Again / The Girl Who Loved Me When – Avco Embassy AV-4584—1971; produced by Goodman
Superfly Meets Shaft (#31)/ Part Two — Rainy Wednesday 201 — 4/14/73; written and produced by Goodman
Soul President Number One / Crossover — Rainy Wednesday 203 — 2/73; written and produced by Goodman; B-side same as "Friends" (see above)

References

External Links
 
 WWW.DICKIEGOODMAN.COM

1934 births
1989 suicides
American comedy musicians
Suicides by firearm in North Carolina
20th-century American musicians
20th-century American comedians
1989 deaths